Senator Stump may refer to:

Bob Stump (1927–2003), Arizona State Senate
Herman Stump (1837–1917), Maryland State Senate
LeRoy Stumpf (born 1944), Minnesota State Senate